The Datong railway station is a railway station of Beijing–Baotou railway and Datong–Puzhou railway. The station located in Datong, Shanxi, China.

History
The station opened in 1914.

See also

Datong South railway station

References

External links

Datong Railway Station(Taiyuan Railway Bureau)

Railway stations in Shanxi
Railway stations in China opened in 1914